Hawaiian Snow is a collaborative mixtape by American rappers Danny Brown and Tony Yayo. The mixtape features exclusive tracks and freestyles from Yayo and Brown, with guest appearances from Lil B and Louie Castro.

Track listing

References

Tony Yayo albums
2010 mixtape albums
Collaborative albums
Danny Brown (rapper) albums
Albums free for download by copyright owner